William Jenkins (1788 – 27 July 1844) was an English cricketer.  Jenkins' batting style is unknown.

Jenkins made his first-class debut for Sussex against a combined Hampshire and Surrey at Petworth Park in 1826.  He made two further first-class appearances for Sussex, against the same opponents in a return fixture at Bramshill Park in that same season, and against Surrey at Midhurst in 1830.  In his three first-class matches, he scored a total of 52 runs at an average of 10.40, with a high score of 17.

He died at Selham, Sussex on 27 July 1844.

References

External links
William Jenkins at ESPNcricinfo
William Jenkins at CricketArchive

1788 births
1844 deaths
English cricketers
Sussex cricketers
English cricketers of 1826 to 1863